The 1967 Holy Cross Crusaders football team was an American football team that represented the College of the Holy Cross as an independent during the 1967 NCAA University Division football season. Following Mel Massucco's resignation, former defensive coordinator Tom Boisture served his first year as head coach. The team compiled a record of 5–5.

All home games were played at Fitton Field on the Holy Cross campus in Worcester, Massachusetts.

Schedule

Statistical leaders
Statistical leaders for the 1967 Crusaders included: 
 Rushing: Tim Hawkes, 458 yards and 1 touchdown on 126 attempts
 Passing: Phil O'Neil, 1,378 yards, 97 completions and 10 touchdowns on 218 attempts
 Receiving: Bob Neary, 485 yards and 3 touchdowns on 34 receptions
 Scoring: John Vrionis, 42 points from 7 touchdowns and # two-point conversions
 Total offense: Phil O'Neil, 1,169 yards (1,378 passing, minus-209 rushing)
 All-purpose yards: Tim Hawkes, 521 yards (458 rushing, 63 receiving)

References

Holy Cross
Holy Cross Crusaders football seasons
Holy Cross Crusaders football